Phryneta aurivillii is a species of beetle in the family Cerambycidae. It was described by Hintz in 1913. It is known from the Democratic Republic of the Congo and Cameroon.

References

Phrynetini
Beetles described in 1913